Live in London is the second live album by American R&B, soul and gospel singer Mavis Staples. It was released on February 8, 2019, by ANTI- Records. The album was recorded on July 9 and 10, 2018, at Union Chapel in London, England.

Background
The album was announced on November 5, 2018. The album is Staples first live album since 2008's Live at the Hideout. The album was recorded during two shows at London's Union Chapel in July 2018.

Promotion and release
The first single from the album, "No Time for Cryin'", was released on November 5, 2018, along with the album's preorder. "Love and Trust" was released as the second single on January 21, 2019. The third and final single, "Slippery People", was released on February 5. All three singles were accompanied by live videos filmed at Union Chapel.

Critical reception

Live in London received generally favorable reviews upon release. At Metacritic, which assigns a normalized rating out of 100 to reviews from mainstream publications, the album received an average score of 79, based on 8 reviews.

Track listing

Personnel
Adapted from the album liner notes.
 Mavis Staples – vocals, producer
 Rick Holmstrom – guitar, background vocals
 Jeff Turmes – bass, background vocals
 Stephen Hodges – drums
 Donny Gerrard – background vocals
 Vicki Randle – background vocals
 Shelia Sachs – album design
 Rob Schnapf – mixing, editing
 Mark Chalecki – mastering
 Paul Hurt – recording

References

Mavis Staples live albums
2019 live albums
Anti- (record label) live albums